They Think It's All Over is a British comedy panel game with a sporting theme produced by Talkback and shown on BBC1. The show's name was taken from Kenneth Wolstenholme's famous 1966 World Cup commentary quotation, "they think it's all over...it is now!" and the show used the phrase to sign off each episode. In 2006 the show's run ended after 11 years on air.

Overview
The show was originally presented by comedian Nick Hancock. Retired England football team captain Gary Lineker and former England cricket team captain David Gower were team captains from 1995 until they announced their retirement from the show in 2003. They were replaced as team captains by former England football goalkeeper David Seaman and former England cricketer Phil Tufnell. Former footballer Ian Wright took over from David Seaman in autumn 2004. From October 2005, Boris Becker replaced Tufnell and Lee Mack took over from Hancock as host.

Occasionally, a team captain was unable to appear on the show due to other commitments so guest captains were drafted in. Six times World Snooker Champion Steve Davis was a regular choice as guest captain, while Matthew Pinsent, Mark Lawrenson, Mick McCarthy, Sam Torrance, Steve Backley, Sharron Davies, Linford Christie and Michael Johnson also appeared in this role. Additionally, Ian Wright was a guest captain before becoming a permanent team captain.

Each team also had a regular panellist. For the team which was originally captained by Gary Lineker this was Rory McGrath for the show's entire run. David Gower was originally teamed up with Lee Hurst. Hurst left the show in 1997 (although he made a reappearance in 2004 on David Seaman's team) and was replaced for the next two series by Jonathan Ross, Jo Brand, Alan Davies, Julian Clary and Phill Jupitus. Despite regularly admitting to having limited sporting knowledge, Ross became the permanent panellist until leaving the show in 2006, and was replaced by Sean Lock for the World Cup and summer sports special editions. The third member of each team varied from week to week, and would typically be a notable sportsperson, broadcaster or comedian.

The show was originally produced for BBC Radio 5, where it was hosted by Des Lynam. The devisers, Simon Bullivant and Bill Matthews, started work on a TV version in 1993 but it was two years before it made it to air. Des Lynam did record a pilot in early 1994 but decided not to do the already commissioned series, which was then put on hold.

In 1999 and 2001, as part of the BBC's Comic Relief broadcasts, one-off special programmes were made called Have I Got Buzzcocks All Over. They combined elements of the show with Have I Got News for You and Never Mind the Buzzcocks, with Angus Deayton as host. In 2002 and 2004, as part of the BBC's Sport Relief broadcasts, one-off special programmes were made called They Think It's All A Question of Sport. They combined elements of the show with A Question of Sport, with Stephen Fry as host.

Kenneth Wolstenholme was unhappy with the use of the phrase for the title of the show. He wrote in his autobiography that he had contacted the BBC to find out what relevance the title had to his most famous line, uttered 30 years earlier. However, when the show was first commissioned, he did accept a fee to re-record his famous commentary for the opening titles, as the original was unusable.

Rounds
Throughout the series, the rounds varied each week. Examples include:
Excuses, where the teams are shown a clip of a sportsperson or a team, and are asked what excuse they gave for a sporting or personal misdemeanour. Examples include Tommy Docherty explaining that Scotland lost 7–0 in the 1954 World Cup to Uruguay because "they were shattered just standing for the National Anthem", and Scottish tennis player Andy Murray claimed that he vomited on the court at the US Open in 2005 because he'd been drinking an isotonic drink to stop him from cramping, but he drank too much too quickly. On a special edition video-only episode of No Holds Barred, Gary's team was asked for Tommy Docherty's excuse for Manchester United's infamous relegation of 1973–74, with Lineker's answer "He wanted to bring pleasure to millions?". Another edition of the excuses round saw Manchester United fans blame Rod Stewart for costing their team the 1991-92 League title to Leeds United by ruining their Old Trafford pitch at a concert in the pre-season delaying vital pitch maintenance.
Celebrations, where the teams are shown a clip of a sportsperson celebrating in a fanciful way, and are asked what the celebration is in aid of. Examples include Arsenal striker Thierry Henry celebrating a goal by recreating the Budweiser "Whassup?" advert, American sprinter Maurice Greene paying tribute to WWE wrestler The Rock, Swedish tennis player Jonas Björkman referencing a comedy routine by Galenskaparna and After Shave, and Manchester United forward (and future manager) Ole Gunnar Solskjaer celebrating a goal by recreating a pose of his boyhood hero Elvis Presley. 
Sporting Bluff, in which the teams are given three statements about a sportsperson and have to guess which one is true.
What's Going On?, where the teams are shown a sporting clip and are asked to decipher what's going on, quite literally. Examples include former cricket umpire Dickie Bird taking part in a photo opportunity with the Yorkshire players picked for the England cricket team, dressed in a chef's outfit and cooking them Yorkshire puddings, the annual Wife Carrying World Championships in Finland, and Scottish Youth Dance Company dancer Andy Howitt recreating Michael Owen's goal against Argentina in the 1998 FIFA World Cup as a ballet dance.
Photo Opportunities, where each team is shown a photo of a sportsperson in an unfamiliar pose and asked what the circumstances behind the photos were. Examples include swimmer Sharron Davies beside two men dressed as chips to promote National Chip Week, Manchester United manager Alex Ferguson partnering with The Wombles for a campaign against litter in Manchester, and serial practical joker (and Eric Cantona lookalike) Karl Power joining the Manchester United team for a photo before a Champions League match in 2001.
Photo-fit, where the teams are shown a picture of three sportspersons merged into one. The teams then have to guess who they are. Sometimes after the sportspersons are revealed, they are asked for the connection between them for a bonus point. In early series, Rory McGrath joked that he recognised the person in the photo as an ex-girlfriend he'd previously had sexual encounters with.
Author Author, in which the teams hear an extract from a sporting autobiography or interview and attempt to identify the author. Quotes include former Liverpool F.C. manager Gérard Houllier on why he turned down offers of international coaching, cricket umpire Shakoor Rana offering his opinion on Mike Gatting following their infamous 1987 on-pitch argument, and a quote from athlete Roger Black's autobiography on his admiration of David Gower.
Sing When You're Winning, in which the teams must complete the lyrics to a sporting song, poem or chant performed by football fans or the Barmy Army. A memorable moment from this round saw Chris Eubank complete a poem by Barnsley-supporting poet Ian McMillan, with the line "I'm having a laugh", when the line was "We'll be champions come May". One of the more memorable reactions to not winning this round occurred when Matthew Corbett and Sooty were guests and when denied points, Sooty went on to squirt Nick in the face with a water pistol, followed by Nick emptying his water bottle over Corbett's head in retaliation.
Handbags, where the teams must work out the reasons for a rift between sportspersons. Examples of rifts include football team Peterborough United F.C. and Victoria Beckham over the rights to use the nickname "Posh", and athlete David Bedford and communications company InfoNXX over the 118 118 runners looking like him.
Grandstand, in which the teams are shown a bizarre multi-sport event and are asked to come up with events played in them. These include the Eskimo Olympics, the Naked Olympics and the Tough Guy Sports.
Electronic Pencil, where the teams are shown a brief sporting clip, which is then paused, or a doctored photo of a sportsperson with items removed. The teams use the electronic pencil to predict the direction of the athlete or the ball, or what the missing items were. The round was dropped after series 2 but revived for the 100th show in 2001.
Half-Time, where each team is shown a clip of sporting footage with the sound removed and asked to provide their own dub over the clip. The teams were not awarded points for this segment, which was dropped after series 2. Clips used include vintage footage of the Eton wall game (which David's team overdubbed as David Gower's Schooldays) and coverage of the O. J. Simpson low-speed police chase (with Alistair McGowan dubbing over it as Trevor Brooking and Alan Hansen on Match of the Day).
Injury Board, in which the teams pick a number between 1 and 12. Behind each number is a sports person and another person or item. The teams try to work out how the latter injured the former. Examples include Newbury rugby club and some Vaseline (to which guest Julian Clary suggested "maybe there was sand in it") and Dennis Wise and a toilet seat. This round was also a parody of A Question of Sport, another BBC TV quiz show.
Temper, Temper, where the teams are shown a clip of a sporting star losing their temper, and are asked to explain the source of their ire. Examples include English cricketer Darren Gough's heated argument with Sri Lankan cricketer Roshan Mahanama after their run-in on the pitch, and tennis player Venus Williams' tearful rant at the umpire when he ruled that her beaded hair coming apart during a match in the 1999 Australian Open against Lindsay Davenport was ruled to have created a disturbance on the court.
Rules of the Game, where the teams are shown a sporting event such as the Eton wall game or a clip of football mascots fighting, and are asked to guess what the main rules of the games or associated codes of conduct are.
The Treble, where the teams are shown three sportspersons and three items, and have to link each sportsperson to an item.
The Beckham Challenge, where the teams are asked an on-the-buzzer question about David Beckham and his family. The first team to get the answer right gets further bonus questions, similar to University Challenge. This was later changed to having separate questions for each team. Variants to this round include Sven-Mania (with questions about then-England manager Sven-Göran Eriksson), Wayne-Mania (with questions about Wayne Rooney) and Gaffer-Mania (with questions about football managers in general).
Feel The Sportsman, one of the most popular rounds of the show, in which the regular panellists have to try to identify a mystery guest, or their sporting notability, by touch whilst blindfolded. Guests subjected to a groping include Will Carling, Ashia Hansen, Henry Cooper, Lucinda Green, Geoff Capes, Victor Ubogu, Jonah Lomu (who infamously appeared minutes after Chris Eubank had been goaded into calling him "a big poof"), Andy Fordham, Manc Union Paintball Team, Arsenal Women's Football Team (which Rory guessed right on the whistle), Aylesbury United F.C. in their infamous 1995 FA Cup duck conga goal celebration, a preserved Mick the Miller, the Subbuteo Gary Lineker, a cardboard cutout of Roy of the Rovers, Tony Bullimore, Stirling Moss and the aforementioned Karl Power. One notable variant in 2001 saw the regulars feeling an animal, having been shown a clip of Sven-Göran Eriksson on Italian television trying to identify animals by touch alone. David Gower and Jonathan Ross correctly guessed their animal (a zebra) but Gary Lineker and Rory McGrath failed to get theirs (an alligator – they failed to even touch it), with McGrath and Lineker removing their blindfolds and running off the set in panic. Occasionally, the guests get to play in lieu of one of the regulars; a notable example was Sharron Davies, when the sportsman was her then husband Derek Redmond, whom she recognised.
Claim To Fame, introduced in 2005, saw a sportsperson subjected to a line of questioning by the panel to determine their claim to fame. Mystery people include Paul Barber (a member of the gold medal-winning British 1988 Olympic hockey team), Judy Grinham (gold medal-winning 100m backstroke swimmer at the 1956 Olympics) and Tommy Gemmell, from the Celtic European Cup winning team of 1967.
The Physical Challenge, where the teams are subject to displaying their physique on an exercise bike, tricycle or other exercise apparatus. The harder they pedal, the faster an image appears on screen, and the teams must name the image before moving onto the next one. The team captain starts off before a klaxon is sounded, then the regular sidekick takes over. The guests occasionally had a turn as well.
The Name Game, in which the regular sidekick has to give clues about a famous sportsperson for the other team members to guess. Variants include the sidekick having to draw out the clues, giving clues as to team names and performing impressions, or miming of the sportsperson. One famous incident in this round saw Rory get a point deduction for giving clues like "Same first name as Ian Rush, same last name as Ian Botham". Rory also got away with pretending Gary gave an answer when he had not, by saying "That's right, speak up!". He also criticised the media hype over Ryan Giggs's winning FA Cup semi-final goal against Arsenal, by giving the clue "Welsh football player, scored what is probably the most overrated goal of the season".
Sporting Vogue, introduced in 2005, where the team captain has to strike a famous pose by a sportsperson for their teammates to guess.
School Sports Day, shown only on the video-exclusive No Holds Barred episode, was a pre-recorded segment featuring the regulars participating in a school sports day at King's College School as though it was covered by Grandstand, with Nick as the presenter and Gerald Sinstadt as the commentator. The events were the Egg-and-spoon race, the Three-legged race, the Egg Catching (with England cricketer Nasser Hussain throwing the eggs), the Obstacle course and the Sack race. Although Gary won the individual contest, David's team earned more points in the sports day and back in the studio were awarded one point for their efforts.
Grand Prix, shown only on the video-exclusive Full Throttle episode, was another pre-recorded segment featuring the regulars participating in a six-lap race in "Formula 27 dinky cars" at Silverstone, using similar on-screen graphics to Formula 1 coverage on ITV at the time (even breaking into a "commercial break" for the No Holds Barred video near to the climax of the race, only to return just before Lee span off the track, which was ripping on ITV holding commercial breaks during key moments in the races), and a commentator imitating Murray Walker. Lee and David raced in Williams-coloured cars, while Gary and Rory raced in Jordan-liveried cars. Lee span out on the final lap and was disqualified. David won the race, winning 10 points for his team. Gary and Rory finished joint second, winning 5 points each, thus leading to Nick back in the studio declaring the race "a complete waste of a day".
Sporting Chicken, also shown only on the video-exclusive Full Throttle episode, saw the teams watching a fiercely-contested women's doubles tennis match. It was up to the individual members of each team to press their buzzers before the rally ended, with three points going to the person to buzz in last, but anyone who failed to buzz before the end of the rally would be deducted a point. In the end, David's team won two points as Lee failed to buzz before the ball went out of play.

Tie-Breakers
All episodes ending with a tie score or series ending with the number of episodes tied finish with a tie-breaker. Sometimes, the tie-breaker refers to incidents from previously in the episode. These have included:
A sports general knowledge question, sometimes from the quiz books endorsed by team captains Gary Lineker or David Gower.
An episode featuring England cricket captain Nasser Hussain ended with Nick tossing a coin and getting Nasser, who had previous bad luck with coin tosses, to call Heads or Tails. He got it wrong, saying '&$%£ing Tails' as Nick showed him the result.
A game of musical chairs featuring the regulars.
A mechanical bull or surfboard, which the panellists (usually Jonathan Ross versus Rory McGrath, or Jonathan versus his brother Paul in the surfboard example) ride, with the panellist who stays on for the longest before falling off winning.
A game of round-the-table table tennis between all the panellists.
A game of Paper-Scissors-Stone between David and Gary. (Gary and Rory were spotted by Nick discussing tactics.)
An arm-wrestling match between David and Gary.
A "pseudo sumo" match between David and Gary, with the two captains in inflatable sumo suits.
A race between David and Gary on tea trays with wheels, in honour of British Winter Olympic bronze medalist skeleton racer Alex Coomber
A pre-recorded race between two hamsters in moving wheels - David picked the 'winner' first; Gary's hamster was shown travelling backwards.
A "black ball fight" (first to pot the only ball) on a miniature snooker table between guest captain Steve Davis and Ronnie O'Sullivan. Ronnie was required to wear a facsimile of Dennis Taylor's glasses to give him a psychological advantage.
A wrestling match in a pool of mashed potato between David and Gary, with the audience cheering for who they thought won.
A coconut shy-type game where, following a dressing room incident between Alex Ferguson and David Beckham where Ferguson reportedly kicked a football boot which hit Beckham in the head, all the panelists took turns to kick a football boot at cardboard cut-outs of Beckham's face.
A toy fishing game between Phil Tufnell and David Seaman.
A game of blow football between Boris Becker and Ian Wright.

Episodes

Controversy
In May 2020, Luke Chadwick spoke openly to the media on how being mocked for his looks on the show repeatedly had affected his mental health. He said how the show commented on "spots on my face, teeth sticking out, that sort of thing" and how the repetition of the comments wore him down and made his anxious.  Nick Hancock was interviewed by BBC Breakfast and apologised saying: "I’m appalled for him and at myself. When I hear him speaking, I’m full of admiration for the present Luke Chadwick and full of sympathy for the young Luke Chadwick, and personally I just feel a great deal of responsibility and shame, which I do accept and have to hold my hands up to."  Upon the story breaking, Gary Lineker took to Twitter to apologise to Luke. Chadwick accepted both of their apologies.

DVD and video releases

DVD
The Very Best of They Think Its All Over – 10th Anniversary (2005)
The Very Best of They Think Its All Over Interactive DVD Game (2007)

Video
They Think It's All Over – No Holds Barred (1996)
They Think It's All Over – Full Throttle (aka Grand Prixxx) (1997)
They Think It's All Over – Below The Belt (aka Off The Bone) (1998)
They Think It's All Over – Complete (1999) – Existing No Holds Barred and Full Throttle videos re-packaged as a double video set.
They Think It's All Over- Ungentlemanly Conduct (aka New Balls) (2000)

Other releases
The "They Think It's All Over" Annual (1997) – an annual which parodied the style of children's comic annuals.
They Think It's All Over (1998) – audiobook highlights compilation, part of the Canned Laughter series of releases.

References

External links

1990s British comedy television series
2000s British comedy television series
1995 British television series debuts
2006 British television series endings
BBC panel games
BBC television comedy
British panel games
1990s British game shows
2000s British game shows
1990s British sports television series
2000s British sports television series
Television series by Fremantle (company)
English-language television shows
Television game shows with incorrect disambiguation